Aeromonas punctata is a synonym of Aeromonas caviae. The bacterium is found in sewage, fresh water and in animals.

References

External links
 Aeromonas J.P. Euzéby: List of Prokaryotic names with Standing in Nomenclature

Aeromonadales
Bacteria described in 1890